Lydia Caruana is a Maltese operatic soprano who performs in the opera houses and concert halls of Europe and her native Malta. She has sung in two rarely performed operas by Maltese composers, Carmelo Pace's I martiri and Nicolo Isouard's Jeannot et Colin.

Biography
Lydia Caruana was born in Malta, and initially studied music at the Johann Strauss School of Music in Valletta. She later furthered her studies in singing with the Maltese soprano  Antoinette Miggiani and took master classes in Vienna with the Armenian-Austrian soprano, Sona Ghazarian. She made her operatic debut as Musetta in La bohème at the Teatru Manoel in Valletta in 1995.

Amongst the roles she has performed in Italy and Malta are the title role in Suor Angelica, Mimi in La bohème,  Norina in Don Pasquale, Elvira in Don Giovanni and Rosalinde in Die Fledermaus. She has also sung in rarely performed operas such as Nicolo Isouard’s  Jeannot et Colin (as Thérèse) and Carmelo Pace's I martiri (as Graziella). While she retains her interest in performing and creating roles which are not in the standard operatic repertoire, she continues to perform in Italian opera, as in her concerts with the Berwald Symphony Orchestra of Stockholm conducted by Manfred Honeck and the Malta Philharmonic Orchestra conducted by Charles Olivieri Monroe.

Caruana has sung in major concert halls across Europe such as the Musikverein in Vienna, National Concert Hall in Dublin, Laeiszhalle in Hamburg, Theatre of the Estates in Prague and Accademia Filarmonica di Bologna. In 2005, concert tours with the Belarusian State Symphony Orchestra took her to 16 German cities. She also sang in the Das Neue Europa Festival in Ingolstadt accompanied by the Georgian Chamber Orchestra. During 2006 she presented a Mozart programme in the final concert of the Valletta International Sacred Music Festival, a programme which she also performed in St. Giles Cathedral, Edinburgh. In 2007 Caruana partnered, on different occasions, José Carreras and Andrea Bocelli in Malta and Joseph Calleja in Regensburg for the Rathaus concert series.

Lydia Caruana is also an active recitalist, with a repertoire ranging from Haydn and Liszt to de Falla. In 2006, she gave a series of recitals in Vienna and Malta with pianist Paul Gulda, with whom she also recorded a CD of Mediterranean songs. In 2008, she recorded a programme of Maltese composers, and their European contemporaries for the Austrian broadcasting company ORF in Vienna.

Recordings
Mediterranean Melodies - Lydia Caruana (soprano) and Paul Gulda (piano), 2007. Label: Gramola.

Past performances (highlights)

2008
La Bohème (Mimi) - Aurora Opera House, Victoria, Malta
Malta Felice! - ORF Radiokulturhaus, Vienna
Malta Felice! - Salzkammergut Festwochen, Gmunden Festwochen Schloss Roith, Gmunden
Lydia Caruana in Concert - Mediterranean Centre, Valletta.
Celebrity Recital of Czech and Maltese Composers - Phoenicia Concert Hall, Valletta

2007
Concert with  José Carreras - Malta Philharmonic Orchestra;  St George's Square, Valletta
Concerto del soprano Lydia Caruana - Accademia di Bologna, Bologna
Rathauskonzerte Series 2007 - Rathaus, Regensburg
Love is in the Air - Presidential Palace, Valletta
20th Century Music from Malta - Estates Theatre, Prague
Sterling Opera Recital''' - Phoenicia Concert Hall, Valletta

2006Concert with Andrea Bocelli - Malta Convention CentreInternational Opera Gala -  National Concert Hall, Dublin and City Hall, CorkA Celebration of Mediterranean Arias - Bösendorfer-Saal, ViennaOpera Gala Concert - Badner Stadttheatre Orchestra; Teatru Manoel, VallettaA Celebration of Mediterranean Arias  - Teatru Manoel, VallettaFinale Concert - International Sacred Music Festival; Vienna-Malta Baroque Ensemble; St John's Cathedral, VallettaSemper Europa Nostra - concert; Auberge d’Aragon, Valletta

2005An Evening of Romantic Arias - St. Finbarr's Cathedral, CorkNations in Dialogue - concert; Palazzo Parisio, VallettaConcert with Soloists of the Vienna Chamber Orchestra - Teatru Manoel,	VallettaDas Neue Europa - concert, Stadttheater, Ingolstadt
16 city concert tour - Wiener Johann Strauss Philharmonie of Belarus

Before 2005Don Giovanni (Elvira) - Teatru Manoel, VallettaCrossroads of Civilisations - United Nations Concert; WIPO, GenevaMozart Concert in St Giles, Edinburgh, ScotlandDon Pasquale (Norina) - new production; Teatro Petrarca, Arezzo; Teatro di Valdarno, Valdarno; Teatru Manoel, VallettaLa bohème (Musetta) - Teatru Manoel, VallettaI martiri (Graziella) - Teatru Manoel, VallettaDie Fledermaus (Rosalinde) - Teatru Manoel, VallettaPuccini Gala Night - Teatru Manoel, VallettaStabat Mater - Commemoration Concert; Teatru Manoel, VallettaJeannot et Colin'' (Thèrése) - Teatru Manoel, Valletta

References

External links
Lydia Caruana official web site

Year of birth missing (living people)
Living people
21st-century Maltese women singers
21st-century Maltese singers
Maltese operatic sopranos
21st-century women opera singers